Arasan may refer to:
Arasan, Kazakhstan
Arasan (health complex), in Alma-Ata
Arasanj (disambiguation), places in Iran
Khoon Ka Karz, a Bollywood film, whose Tamil title is Arasan
A font in the Armenian alphabet